Isadora Quanehia Ding Welsh (June 8, 1931 – February 20, 2010), known professionally as Loni Ding, was an documentary film maker, director, television series producer, activist, and university educator. She is known for her work exploring the experiences of Asian Americans. Notably, two of her films played a critical role in the passage of the Civil Liberties Act of 1988 which granted reparations to Japanese Americans who were incarcerated during World War II.

Early life 
Ding grew up in San Francisco, initially living Chinatown where her parents ran an herb shop. Her parents were originally from Guangdong, China. Ding was the youngest of seven children. According to Ding, at this time, she would notice the differences between Asian Americans and white individuals living in San Francisco, and she would think about how she navigated between those different spaces, sparking her interest in Asian American issues and studying the Asian American experience.

Career 
Ding studied at the University of California, Berkeley, receiving a master's degree in sociology. She taught as a lecturer in the university's sociology department between 1958 and 1967.

Between 1980 and 2009, she taught film and media analysis in the Asian American Studies Program at the Ethnic Studies Department of the University of California, Berkeley. She also taught as a visiting faculty member at Cornell University in 1991, New School for Social Research in New York City in 1999, and Mills College. She was also Distinguished Visiting Professor at the University of California, Santa Cruz in 1998.

Ding was a prolific television producer. She also worked on productions with organizations such as the California Historical Society, the California State Department of Education, Chinese for Affirmative Action, the San Francisco Opera Center, and KQED-TV.

She produced many films that documented early Asian immigrant stories including Nisei Soldier in 1984 and Ancestors in the Americas in 1997--she was one of the first directors to do so.

She co-founded media and arts organizations including the Center for Asian American Media (CAAM) and helped establish the Independent Television Service (ITVS). 

She was awarded a Guggenheim Fellowship in 1982, an American Film Institute Directors Fellowship in 1983, and a Rockefeller Foundation Film/Video Fellowship in 1994.

In 2011, the Center for Asian American Media (CAAM) in association with the Asian American Journalists Association established the Loni Ding Award In Social Issue Documentary award "in memory of Loni Ding’s spirit and vision for creating media about the Asian American experience."

She died on February 20, 2010, in Oakland, California, following a stroke.

Awards

 Rockefeller Foundation, Intercultural Film/Video Fellowship, 1994 
 20th Anniversary Honoree, Chinese for Affirmative Action, SF, 1989 
 Media Alliance, Meritorious Achievement (Film/Video), SF, 1989 
 Artist's Award, State of California Arts Council, 1988 
 National Japanese American Citizens League, Legislative Education Committee Award, 1988 
 James D. Phelan Award for Video, SF, 1988 
 Asian CineVision, Annual Filmmaker's Award, NY, 1988
 Award of Honor, San Francisco Arts Commission, 1987 
 Asian Cultural Council, US/Japan Fellow, NY, 1986 
 Association of Asian Pacific American Artists Media Award, LA, 1985 
 Steven Tatsukawa Memorial Fund Award, LA, 1985 
 American Film Institute Director's Fellowship, LA, 1983 
 University Plaque of Honor, Syracuse University, 1983 
 John Simon Guggenheim Fellowship, 1982 
 San Francisco State University, Broadcast Preceptor Award, 1981 
 Corporation for Public Broadcasting Senior Producer's Fellowship, 1980

References 

University of California, Berkeley alumni
University of California, Berkeley faculty
1931 births
2010 deaths
American women documentary filmmakers
People from San Francisco
American people of Chinese descent
Emmy Award winners
American women television producers
Asian-American movement activists
American women film directors